Republic of Equals: Predistribution and Property-Owning Democracy is a book-length study of property-owning democracy by Alan Thomas in which the author argues that a society in which capital is universally accessible to all citizens uniquely meets the demands of justice.

References

External links 
 Republic of Equals: Predistribution and Property-Owning Democracy

2016 non-fiction books
Ethics books
Oxford University Press books
Books in political philosophy
Books about capitalism
Works about John Rawls